was a Japanese football player.

Club career
Sanada was born in Shizuoka on March 6, 1968. After graduating from Juntendo University, he joined All Nippon Airways in 1990. He played as regular goalkeeper from first season. In 1992, he moved to new club Shimizu S-Pulse based in his local. Although he played in all matches in 1992, he battles with Sidmar for the position from 1993. After Sidmar retired end of 1995 season, Sanada became completely regular goalkeeper. The club won the champion 1996 J.League Cup their first title. In 1999, the club won the 2nd place J1 League and he was elected Best XI. In Asia, the club won the champions 1999–2000 Asian Cup Winners' Cup their first Asian champions. From 2001, his opportunity to play decreased behind young goalkeepers Keisuke Hada and Takaya Kurokawa. He retired end of 2004 season.

National team career
In 1988, when Sanada was a Juntendo University student, he was selected Japan national "B team" for 1988 Asian Cup. At this competition, he played 3 games. However, Japan Football Association don't count as Japan national team match because this Japan team was "B team" not "top team"

Coaching career
After retirement, Sanada became a goalkeeper coach at Shimizu S-Pulse in 2005. In 2008, he moved to JEF United Chiba. In 2011, he returned to S-Pulse. However he rested for health problem from September 2.

On September 6, 2011, Sanada died of heart failure in Shizuoka at the age of 43.

Club statistics

References

External links

1968 births
2011 deaths
Juntendo University alumni
Association football people from Shizuoka Prefecture
Japanese footballers
Japan Soccer League players
J1 League players
Yokohama Flügels players
Shimizu S-Pulse players
1988 AFC Asian Cup players
Association football goalkeepers